Phloeostiba is a genus of beetles belonging to the family Staphylinidae.

The species of this genus are found in Eurasia, Australia and Northern America.

Species:
 Phloeostiba azorica (Fauvel, 1900)
 Phloeostiba kamijoi Watanabe, 2009

References

Staphylinidae
Staphylinidae genera